Summit Valley is a valley along SR 138 in the San Bernardino Mountains, east of Cajon Pass within San Bernardino County, California.

The West Fork Mohave River descends from Silverwood Lake reservoir through the eastern part of Summit Valley to the confluence.

References

Valleys of San Bernardino County, California
San Bernardino Mountains